Villainville is a commune in the Seine-Maritime department in the Normandy region in northern France.

Geography

Population

Places of interest
 The church of St. Jacques, dating from the eleventh century.

Twin towns
 Newchurch, Isle of Wight, England

See also
Communes of the Seine-Maritime department

References

External links

 Newchurch Twinning website

Communes of Seine-Maritime